Crassispira incrassata, common name the thickened pleurotoma, is a species of sea snail, a marine gastropod mollusk in the family Pseudomelatomidae.

ITIS considers Crassispira bottae a synonym of Crassispira incrassata  McLean confirmed that Pleurotoma bottae was a synonym of Crassispira incrassata  The radula and the morphology was studied by Kantor et al. in 1997

Description
The length of the shell varies between 30 mm and 50 mm.

The shell is acuminately pyramidal, thick, blackish. The whorls are obsoletely keeled near the suture, keel interrupted, longitudinally ribbed beneath, ribs grained and crossed with raised lines. The outer lip is thickened near the edge. The sinus is broad. The siphonal canal is short.

Distribution
This marine species occurs from the Sea of Cortez, Western Mexico to Ecuador

References

 G.B. Sowberby I. Proc. Geol. Soc., 1833, p. 137

External links
 
 

incrassata
Gastropods described in 1834